Inner Savonia is a subdivision of Northern Savonia and one of the Sub-regions of Finland since 2009.

Municipalities
 Rautalampi
 Suonenjoki
 Tervo
 Vesanto

Politics
Results of the 2018 Finnish presidential election:

 Sauli Niinistö   64.2%
 Matti Vanhanen   8.9%
 Paavo Väyrynen   7.3%
 Laura Huhtasaari   6.4%
 Pekka Haavisto   6.3%
 Tuula Haatainen   3.2%
 Merja Kyllönen   3.2%
 Nils Torvalds   0.5%

Sub-regions of Finland
Geography of North Savo